31st NSFC Awards
January 5, 1997

Best Film: 
 Breaking the Waves 
The 31st National Society of Film Critics Awards, given by the National Society of Film Critics on January 5, 1997, honored the best in film for 1996.

Winners

Best Picture 
1. Breaking the Waves
2. Secrets & Lies
3. Dead Man

Best Director 
1. Lars von Trier – Breaking the Waves
2. Mike Leigh – Secrets & Lies
3. Jim Jarmusch – Dead Man

Best Actor 
1. Eddie Murphy – The Nutty Professor
2. Vincent D'Onofrio – The Whole Wide World
3. Geoffrey Rush – Shine

Best Actress 
1. Emily Watson – Breaking the Waves
2. Brenda Blethyn – Secrets & Lies
3. Frances McDormand – Fargo
3. Lili Taylor – I Shot Andy Warhol

Best Supporting Actor 
1. Martin Donovan – The Portrait of a Lady
1. Tony Shalhoub – Big Night
3. Edward Norton – Everyone Says I Love You, The People vs. Larry Flynt and Primal Fear

Best Supporting Actress 
1. Barbara Hershey – The Portrait of a Lady
2. Renée Zellweger – Jerry Maguire
3. Kristin Scott Thomas – The English Patient

Best Screenplay 
1. Albert Brooks and Monica Johnson – Mother
2. Joseph Tropiano and Stanley Tucci – Big Night
3. David O. Russell – Flirting with Disaster

Best Cinematography 
1. Robby Müller – Breaking the Waves and Dead Man
2. Chris Menges – Michael Collins
3. John Seale – The English Patient

Best Foreign Language Film 
1. La Cérémonie
2. Lamerica
3. Chungking Express (Chung Hing sam lam)

Best Documentary 
1. When We Were Kings
2. Anne Frank Remembered
3. Paradise Lost: The Child Murders at Robin Hood Hills

Special Citation 
James Katz and Robert A. Harris for their restoration of Alfred Hitchcock's classic film Vertigo.

References

External links
Past Awards

1996
National Society of Film Critics Awards
National Society of Film Critics Awards
National Society of Film Critics Awards